Aahaa..! is a 1997 Indian Tamil-language drama film directed by Suresh Krissna starring Rajiv Krishna and Sulekha. The film was a decent hit among Diwali releases and ran for 100 days. The film depicts a typical Brahmin family.

This film later remade in Telugu titled Aahaa..! starring Jagapathi Babu and in Kannada as Ghauttham starring Prem Kumar.

Plot
Parasuraman is a rich businessman who lives with his wife Pattammal, elder son Raghu, younger son Sriram, and a physically challenged daughter. Raghu is more matured, and he assists his father in managing the business, while Sriram is a fun-loving person. Parasuraman hates Sriram's careless attitude, and he keeps scolding him often for his irresponsible behavior. Rajeshwari is Raghu's wife, and she is close to her family members.

Sriram falls in love with Janaki, daughter of Ganesan, a cook. Sriram gets Rajeshwari's help to convince Parasuraman about his love. But Parasuraman does not accept his son's love as Ganesan is from low societal status. One day, Sriram follows Raghu and learns about his relationship with Geetha. Sriram is angered thinking that they are in illegitimate relationship. But Raghu tells a flashback that both he and Geetha were in love during college days, and suddenly Geetha went away without informing Raghu. After a few years Raghu married Rajeshwari, and recently, he got a call from Geetha. While meeting, Raghu got to know that Geetha was suffering from brain tumor, and that was the reason she decided to stay away from Raghu. As she approached her last days, Geetha requested Raghu to be near her as she died and he accepted.

Sriram understands the situation and befriends Geetha. One day, Geetha's condition gets serious, and Sriram rushes her to the hospital, as Raghu is away for a business meeting. Geetha dies in the hospital. Parasuraman spots Sriram along with Geetha while he took her to the hospital, misunderstands that Sriram is in relationship with another girl, and scolds him. Sriram accepts the blame as he does not want his brother's marriage life to be spoiled by revealing the truth. Raghu thanks Sriram for taking care of all the formalities after Geetha's death during his absence.

Parasuraman's daughter's wedding is fixed, and Raghu has to travel to Chidambaram on the day before the marriage for a business meeting. The train in which Raghu travels meets with an accident. Sriram gets the information and rushes to the railway station and is shocked to see Raghu's name in the passengers’ death list. Sriram does not inform this to his family as he does not want his sister's wedding to be cancelled because of this. Sriram hides the information and pretends to be happy in front of others. Meanwhile, everyone starts looking for Raghu as he is expected to return on the day of marriage. Sriram lies that Raghu's meeting got extended, and he is unable to attend the wedding.

Parasuraman's daughter's wedding is done, and now Sriram informs about Raghu's death to everyone. All the family members get shocked hearing this. To everyone's surprise, Raghu suddenly comes alive to the wedding hall. Sriram inquires about the train accident to Raghu. Raghu informs that he missed boarding the train at the last minute, and he finally took a car, and luckily he was escaped from the accident. He apologizes to everyone as he did not inform about this to them, as he was busy with the meetings. Now, Parasuraman understands Sriram's responsible behavior and affection towards his sister, as he does not want her wedding to be cancelled, and starts praising Sriram. Meanwhile, Raghu also informs the truth about his relationship with Geetha and clarifies that Sriram is no way connected to her. Raghu also apologizes to Rajeshwari for hiding the truth about Geetha which she forgives immediately. At the end, Sriram marries Janaki.

Cast

 Rajiv Krishna as Shreeram
 Sulekha as Janaki
 Vijayakumar as Pepsi Parasuraman
 Raghuvaran as Raghuraman 
 Bhanupriya as Rajeshwari "Raji"
 Delhi Ganesh as AGS.Ganesan
 Radhabhai as Lakshmi
 Srividya as Pattu @ Pattamal
 Sukanya as Geetha
 Master Mahendran as Ajay
 Kavithalaya Krishnan as Krishna
 Dhamu as a cook
 Mohan Raman as Vishwanathan Iyer
 Bombay Gnanam as Mrs Vishvanathan
 M.R.K. as Priest

Production
The film marked a comeback for actress Bhanupriya, while debutants Rajiv Krishna (Chandresh) and Sulekha were selected to play the lead roles.

Soundtrack
Music was composed by Deva, while lyrics were written by Vaasan. Song "Mudhan Mudhalil" was inspired by the Hindi song "Sochenge Tumhe Pyaar" from Deewana.

Release 
A critic from The Hindu opined that "Director Suresh Krishna deserves praise for presenting a clean and wholesome family entertainer".

References

External links
 

1997 films
Tamil films remade in other languages
Films directed by Suresh Krissna
Films scored by Deva (composer)
1990s Tamil-language films
Films with screenplays by Crazy Mohan